Emmanuelle is the lead character in a series of erotic films.

Emmanuelle may also refer to:
 Emmanuelle (given name)
 Emmanuelle (novel), a 1971 erotic novel by Emmanuelle Arsan
 Emmanuelle (film), a 1974 film based on the novel
 Emmanuelle (video game), a 1989 video game loosely based on the novel

See also
 Emanuel (disambiguation)